The Library of American Comics is an American publisher of comic strip reprint collections, as an imprint of Clover Press (previously known as IDW Publishing). Although the publishing of a series was advertised as going to be the "complete collection" of a strip, more than half of all LoAC titles were discontinued long before being complete, sometimes after only one or two volumes.

Collections

Single releases

LoAC Essentials 
LoAC Essentials or The Library of American Comics - Essentials is a series of books, published between 2012 and 2019, that collected reprints of classic daily newspaper comic strips which are considered as essentials of comic history in different aspects due to their impact on the medium itself, in volumes by strip title and original publication year. LoAC Essentials were published in hardcovers with the odd format of 11.5 inches × 4.25 inches, 292 mm × 108 mm. The comic strips were printed one strip per page in black-and-white together with the original publication date and weekday. Each volume contained one year of a comic strip's run. Extras such as introductions and essays were included in some of the volumes.

Factual, historical and biographical titles

References 

The Library of American Comics publications
Lists of comics by publisher
Comics by company